Angola is an unincorporated community in Labette County, Kansas, United States.

History
Angola was laid out in 1886.  The post office was established January 31, 1887, and discontinued September 16, 1971. The community was served by the Missouri-Kansas-Texas Railroad for many years, however flooding on the Verdigris River washed out the railroad bridge in the 1970s and rail traffic was thereafter re-routed, no longer passing through Angola.

Education
The community is served by Labette County USD 506 public school district.

References

Further reading

External links
 Labette County maps: Current, Historic, KDOT

Unincorporated communities in Labette County, Kansas
Unincorporated communities in Kansas
Populated places established in 1887